The Isla de Lobos is a small island located about  southeast of Punta del Este (Uruguay). An islet lies east of the island.

Geography 
The island is an outcropping of rocks as a continuation of the Cuchilla Grande, in an area of the Atlantic Ocean immediately at the mouth (outer limit) of the estuary of Río de la Plata. Administratively, it falls under the jurisdiction of the department of Maldonado, although it constitutes a natural reserve. Somewhat to the northwest is the smaller Gorriti Island which is the secondmost southerly place in Uruguay.

Isla de Lobos was exploited economically until 1992. Hunting the island's marine life was prohibited by law in 1991.
Today it constitutes a nature reserve that is integrated into the "Coastal Islands National Park" administered by the Ministry of Livestock, Agriculture, and Fisheries.

History 
It was first documented by Spanish navigator Juan Díaz de Solís in 1516 and named "San Sebastian de Cádiz". In 1527, it was visited by the Venetian navigator Sebastian Cabot during his expedition to the Río de la Plata and Paraná. In 1528, Diego García de Moguer sailed to the region and named it the "Island of the Snapper." In 1599, the island was visited by Laurens Bicker.

Lighthouse
In 1858 the Uruguayan government erected a lighthouse on the island, which was rebuilt in 1906. With its height of 59 meters above sea level, From the balcony outside, which is accessed by 240 steps, there is a wonderful panoramic view of the island and the coast of Punta del Este.

In July 2001, it became the first automated lighthouse in Uruguay, using solar energy and other new technology. It has a siren that runs on compressed air to provide an alternative signal on days of thick fog.

Animals 
Isla de Lobos and Gorriti Island are parts of a nature reserve, holding the largest colony of South American sea lions and South American fur seals in the western hemisphere: in 2005 there were 250,000 sea lions of the species called "two hairs" and 1,500 of the species known as the "wig." Fewer in numbers, southern elephant seals also appear around the area.

Punta del Este is one of the most famous wintering area for southern right whales in Uruguay and shore-based whale watching is becoming a popular attraction. Can also be found different types of orcas and birds.

The area is one of few areas in Uruguay where more frequent appearances of orcas have been confirmed; their prey in the area may include tunas.

Gallery

References

Bibliography 
 
 

Lobos
Tourism in Uruguay
Punta del Este
Islands of the South Atlantic Ocean
Birdwatching sites in Uruguay